Justin Rafael Quiles Rivera (born March 29, 1990), known professionally as Justin Quiles or J Quiles, is a Puerto Rican-American singer. Quiles has been nominated for Premios Juventud.

Besides writing his own songs, Quiles has written for his colleagues, most notably "Pierde Los Modales", by J Balvin feat. Daddy Yankee, "Take It Off", by Lil Jon feat. Yandel & Becky G, "Recuérdame", by Maluma, "Loba" and "Mi Nena", by Yandel and "Bichota", by Karol G where he also did backing vocals.

Since August 2013, Quiles has been signed to record label Rich Music. In February 2017, Rich Music and Quiles signed a distribution deal with Warner Music's Latin division.

Early life and career beginnings 
Quiles was born in Bridgeport, Connecticut, to a Puerto Rican family, and was raised in Puerto Rico but moved back to Connecticut to finish high school. He has stated in interviews that his father was abusive to his mother, which is why they had to move back to Puerto Rico. He wrote his first song when he was 13 and says he grew up influenced by the music his older brother listened to, such as El General, salsa and hip hop, as well as Wisin y Yandel, Tego Calderon and Don Omar.

Quiles moved back to Puerto Rico to become a singer. He started collaborating with the duo Genio & Baby Johnny. A year later, he went back to Orlando, where he recorded his first single, "Algo Contigo" with producer Lelo.

Quiles signed with the record label Rich Music, based in Miami, in August 2013. His first single with Rich Music was the song "Orgullo", and a remix featuring the Colombian singer J Balvin, which became a Top 20 hit on the Billboard Latin Rhythm Airplay chart.

Career

2015: Carpe Diem and other singles 
Quiles' first album, Carpe Diem, was released in March 2015 and featured the songs "No La Toques", "Nos Envidian". That same year, he also released the single "Me Curare", which gained traction with a remix featuring Colombiano singer Maluma and peaked at number 7 on the Billboard Tropical Songs chart.

2016–2017: La Promesa and future 
On July 29, 2016, Quiles released his second studio album, La Promesa (The Promise), which is how he is sometimes referred to. The album debuted on the Billboard charts as the #1 Latin Rhythm Album and #2 Latin Album overall. The main hit song on that album is "Si Ella Quisiera", which also got a remix by Yandel & Gadiel. The song peaked at number 8 on the Billboard Tropical Songs chart and number 20 on the Billboard Latin Pop Songs chart and was certified Platinum in Spain.

Prior to releasing La Promesa, Quiles had released the mixtape Imperio Nazza: Justin Quiles Edition, produced by duo Musicólogo y Menes. Prior to that, he had been featured on their album Orion, which produced his song, "Si El Mundo Se Acabara". That same year, he also released the EP JQ Miliano, his alter ego, which featured the songs "Culpable", "Ella Baila" (and a remix featuring Messiah).

In 2017, Quiles released the song "Crecia" ft. Bad Bunny & Almighty in the new genre of Latin Trap. He also released the songs "Cuestion De Tiempo" ft. Jory Boy and "Tu Pollo" ft. Sech, and was featured along with Fuego on "Baila Toma" by Osmani Garcia and "Todo Cambio", by Becky G. In July 2017, he opened Premios Juventud with a performance of the song "Egoista". The song peaked at 18th on the Billboard Latin Pop Songs chart and 25th on the Billboard Latin Airplay chart.

Discography

Albums

Collaboration albums

Mixtapes

EPs

Singles

As lead artist

As featured artist

Other charted and certified songs

Songwriting credits

Awards and nominations

Premios Juventud

References

1990 births
Living people
Musicians from Bridgeport, Connecticut
Singers from Florida
Puerto Rican reggaeton musicians
Spanish-language singers of the United States
21st-century Puerto Rican male singers
Latin music songwriters
Warner Music Latina artists
American musicians of Puerto Rican descent